Oratyube (Orta-Töbe) is a rural locality (a selo) and the administrative centre of Oratyubinsky Selsoviet, Nogaysky District, Republic of Dagestan, Russia. The population was 1,099 as of 2010. There are 18 streets. Ortatyube was founded in 1914.

Geography 
It is located 49 km northwest from Terekli-Mekteb.

Nationalities 
Nogais, Dargins and Kabardians live there.

References 

Rural localities in Nogaysky District, Dagestan